Evans Bradshaw (1933 – November 17, 1978) was an American jazz pianist. Born in Memphis, Tennessee, Bradshaw learned piano from an early age and was playing in his father's band by the age of 12. He moved to New York City in 1958 and recorded two albums for the Riverside label. Following these two albums, Bradshaw never recorded again.

Discography
Look Out for Evans Bradshaw! (Riverside, 1958)
Pieces of Eighty-Eight (Riverside, 1959)

References

1933 births
1978 deaths
American jazz pianists
American male pianists
Musicians from Memphis, Tennessee
Musicians from New York City
20th-century American pianists
Jazz musicians from New York (state)
Jazz musicians from Tennessee
20th-century American male musicians
American male jazz musicians